Tylenchorhynchus nudus is a plant pathogenic nematode cause dwarfing disease specially at rice plant.

References

External links 
Nemaplex, University of California - Tylenchorhynchus nudus

Agricultural pest nematodes
Rice diseases
Tylenchida